John Blythe (died 1830s) was the owner of the Kendal and Tweedside estates in Westmoreland Parish, Jamaica. He was elected to the House of Assembly of Jamaica in 1820.

His son with Mary, "a free woman of colour", was the chemist John Buddle Blyth.

See also
 Mesopotamia

References 

Members of the House of Assembly of Jamaica
1830s deaths
Year of birth missing
Jamaican landowners
Westmoreland Parish